Drew Cooper is an American college basketball coach. He is currently the head coach of the Kentucky Wesleyan Panthers men's basketball team.

References

Year of birth missing (living people)
Living people
American men's basketball players
Assumption Greyhounds men's basketball players
Babson Beavers men's basketball coaches
Basketball coaches from Kentucky
Basketball players from Louisville, Kentucky
Bellarmine Knights men's basketball coaches
Kentucky Wesleyan Panthers men's basketball coaches
Northern Kentucky Norse men's basketball coaches
Sportspeople from Louisville, Kentucky
Thomas More Saints men's basketball coaches
Wheelock Wildcats men's basketball coaches